Jornada originally an old Spanish word for a day's walk or journey, often indicating a difficult one, can refer to:

Places
 Jornada del Muerto, New Mexico
 Jornada del Muerto Volcano

Newspapers
 Jornada (La Paz), a newspaper published in La Paz, Bolivia
 La Jornada, Mexico City newspaper
La Jornada (Managua)
 La Jornada Latina, Cincinnati weekly newspaper
Jornada, newspaper in Catalan distributed between May 5 and October 27, 2018.

Computing technology
Jornada (PDA), line of Hewlett Packard PDAs, including:
Jornada 560 series
Jornada Linux Mobility Edition or Jlime, a Linux distribution

Other 
 Cabalgata Jornada Villista; see Cavalcade
 Jornada, the longer act of a 17th-century Spanish play, interspersed with entremés